Count Fidél Pálffy ab Erdőd (6 May 1895 Svätý Jur – 2 March 1946 Budapest) was a Hungarian nobleman who emerged as a leading supporter of Nazism in Hungary.

Early life
After service in the First World War he lived on an estate in Czechoslovakia before returning to Hungary, where he was left bankrupt by the Great Depression of 1929.

Pro-Nazi activity
He founded a group called the Hungarian National Socialist Party in 1933 and later merged it with two similar groups under Sándor Festetics and Zoltán Meskó. By 1935 Pálffy had assumed  control of this group, although it failed to prosper as support drifted to Gyula Gömbös. Devoid of influence, Pálffy turned to Germany and became an agent of the RSHA. Seeking to regain the initiative he worked variously with László Baky and Ferenc Szálasi in an attempt to launch a pro-German party. He finally achieved this goal in 1941 by relaunching the Hungarian National Socialist Party with Baky, although the party was not considered conservative when compared to the Arrow Cross Party.

World War II activism and execution
Pálffy was considered by the SS to be a suitable candidate to lead Hungary, although ultimately the choice was not approved. He also became an important contact for Wilhelm Höttl during his work on behalf of the SS in Budapest. Ultimately, as Minister of Agriculture during the period of Nazi dominance, Pálffy was held to be guilty of collaboration and was hanged for treason in March 1946. His execution did prove somewhat controversial however because, beyond his pro-Nazi writings and his membership in Szálasi's government, there was little evidence of any crimes he had committed. Nonetheless, Pálffy was one of the first members of the government to face trial. The novelty of the case, as well as his status as a member of one of the country's leading noble families, counted against him and he was sent to the gallows.

References

1895 births
1946 deaths
People from Svätý Jur
People from the Kingdom of Hungary
Hungarian nobility
Hungarian Nazis
Arrow Cross Party politicians
Agriculture ministers of Hungary
Hungarian people of World War II
Executed Hungarian people
Executed politicians
Executed Hungarian collaborators with Nazi Germany
People executed by Hungary by hanging
20th-century executions by Hungary